Denys Smirnov (born 18 June 1975) is a professional Ukrainian football midfielder.

Career
Denys Smirnov is a product of Metalurh Zaporizhzhia Youth school system, where he was trained by V. Ischenko. Smirnov gave his debut for the Metalurh Zaporizhzhia senior team on 13 March 1998 during a match versus rivals Nyva Ternopil during the Soviet Cup. Denys later moved to play for Tavriya Simferopol and Zakarpattia Uzhhorod, and during the 2008 season summer transfer moved back to play for Metalurh Zaporizhzhia during the month of July. For Metalurh Zaporizhzhia, Smirnov played 82 matches and scored 5 goals in addition to scoring 2 goals in 7 matches for the Ukrainian Cup.

External links
 Metalurh squad on EUFO
 Metalurh squad on Football Squads

1975 births
Living people
Footballers from Zaporizhzhia
Ukrainian footballers
SC Tavriya Simferopol players
FC Metalurh Zaporizhzhia players
FC Hoverla Uzhhorod players
Association football midfielders